Maurer-Union was a German car maker located in Nuremberg. From 1900-1910 Maurer-Union produced 300 to 400 cars per year. It was one of the first manufacturers that introduced continuously variable transmission using a friction drive.

References

Defunct motor vehicle manufacturers of Germany